Trava may refer to
Trava, Loški Potok, Slovenian village
Trava: Fist Planet, an anime video
Trava, medieval castle in Galicia, Spain
House of Trava, family named for the castle